Sir Mackenzie Bowell  (December 27, 1823 – December 10, 1917) was a Canadian newspaper publisher and politician, who served as the fifth prime minister of Canada, in office from 1894 to 1896.

Bowell was born in Rickinghall, Suffolk, England. He and his family moved to Belleville, Ontario, in 1832. When in his early teens, Bowell was apprenticed to the printing shop of the local newspaper, the Belleville Intelligencer, and some 15 years later, became its owner and proprietor.

In 1867, following Confederation, he was elected to the House of Commons for the Conservative Party. Bowell entered cabinet in 1878, and would serve under three prime ministers: John A. Macdonald, John Abbott, and John Thompson. He served variously as Minister of Customs (1878–1892), Minister of Militia and Defence (1892), and Minister of Trade and Commerce (1892–1894). Bowell kept his Commons seat continuously for 25 years, through a period of Liberal Party rule in the 1870s. In 1892, Bowell was appointed to the Senate. He became Leader of the Government in the Senate the following year.

In December 1894, Prime Minister Thompson unexpectedly died in office. The Earl of Aberdeen, Canada's governor general, appointed Bowell to replace Thompson as prime minister, due to his status as the most senior cabinet member. The main problem of Bowell's tenure as prime minister was the Manitoba Schools Question. His attempts at compromise alienated members of his own party, and following a Cabinet revolt in early 1896 he was forced to resign in favour of Charles Tupper. Bowell stayed on as a senator until his death at the age of 93, but never again held ministerial office; he served continuously as a Canadian parliamentarian for 50 years.

Early life, career, and family

Bowell was born in Rickinghall, England, to John Bowell and Elizabeth Marshall. In 1832 his family emigrated to Belleville, Upper Canada, where he apprenticed with the printer at the town newspaper, The Belleville Intelligencer. He became a successful printer and editor with that newspaper, and later its owner. He was a Freemason and an Orangeman, serving as grandmaster of the Orange Order of British North America, 1870–1878. 
In 1847 he married Harriet Moore, with whom he had five sons and four daughters.

Military service

A keen supporter of the militia in Hastings County, he was appointed an Ensign in the 1st Belleville Militia on July 24, 1856. He helped organize the Belleville Volunteer Militia Rifle Company in 1857 with whom he served on active duty at Amherstburg, Upper Canada, during the Trent Affair. He joined the 15th Belleville Battalion (The Argyll Light Infantry) in 1863, being promoted to captain and fought in the Fenian Raids of 1866, serving at Prescott and being awarded the Canada General Service Medal. He was promoted to Major in the 49th (Hastings) Battalion of Rifles on February 22, 1867, and qualified for the First Class Certificate at the Military School of Instruction on March 1. He was promoted to Brevet Lieutenant-Colonel on February 22, 1872, and retired from the militia on March 24, 1874, with the rank of lieutenant-colonel in that regiment.

Elected to Parliament

Bowell was first elected to the House of Commons in 1867 as a Conservative for the riding of Hastings North, Ontario. He held his seat for the Conservatives when they lost the election of January 1874, in the wake of the Pacific Scandal. Later that year he was instrumental in having Louis Riel expelled from the House.

Appointed to Cabinet, Senator
In 1878, with the Conservatives again governing, he joined the Cabinet as minister of customs. In 1892 he became minister of militia and defence, having held his Commons seat continuously for 25 years. A competent, hardworking administrator, Bowell remained in Cabinet as minister of trade and commerce, a newly created portfolio, after he became a senator that same year. His visit to Australia in 1893 led to the first leaders' conference of British colonies and territories, held in Ottawa in 1894. He became leader of the government in the Senate on October 31, 1893.

Prime minister (1894–1896)
In December 1894, Prime Minister John Sparrow David Thompson died suddenly, and Bowell, as the most senior Cabinet minister, was appointed in Thompson's stead by the Governor General. Bowell thus became the second of just two Canadian prime ministers (after John Abbott) to hold that office while serving in the Senate rather than the House of Commons.

Manitoba Schools Question
As Prime Minister, Bowell faced the Manitoba Schools Question. In 1890, Manitoba had abolished public funding for denominational schools, both Catholic and Protestant, which many thought was contrary to the provisions made for denominational schools in the Manitoba Act of 1870. However, in a court challenge, the Judicial Committee of the Privy Council held that Manitoba's abolition of public funding for denominational schools was consistent with the Manitoba Act provision. In a second court case, the Judicial Committee held that the federal Parliament had the authority to enact remedial legislation to force Manitoba to re-establish the funding.

Leadership crisis
Bowell and his predecessors struggled to solve this problem, which divided the country and even Bowell's own Cabinet. He was further hampered in his handling of the issue by his own indecisiveness on it and by his inability, as a senator, to take part in debates in the House of Commons. Bowell backed legislation, already drafted, that would have forced Manitoba to restore its Catholic schools, but then postponed it due to opposition within his Cabinet. With the ordinary business of government at a standstill, several members of Cabinet decided that Bowell was incompetent to lead. To force him to step down, seven ministers resigned and then foiled the appointment of successors. Bowell denounced them as "a nest of traitors".

Resigns as prime minister
Bowell was forced to resign. After ten days, following an intervention on Bowell's behalf by the Governor General, the government crisis was resolved and matters seemingly returned to normal when six of the ministers were reinstated, but leadership was then effectively held by Charles Tupper, who had joined Cabinet at the same time, filling the seventh place. Tupper, who had been Canadian High Commissioner to the United Kingdom, had been recalled by the plotters to replace Bowell. Bowell formally resigned in favour of Tupper at the end of the parliamentary session.

Later life, and death

Bowell stayed in the Senate, serving as his party's leader there until 1906, and afterward as a regular Senator until his death in 1917, having served continuously for more than 50 years as a federal parliamentarian.

He died of pneumonia in Belleville, seventeen days short of his 94th birthday. He was buried in the Belleville cemetery. His funeral was attended by a full complement of the Orange Order, but not by any currently or formerly elected member of the government.

Legacy
Bowell was designated a National Historic Person in 1945, on the advice of the national Historic Sites and Monuments Board.

The Post Office Department honored Bowell with a commemorative stamp in 1954, part of a series on prime ministers.

In their 1998 study of the Canadian prime ministers up through Jean Chrétien, J. L. Granatstein and Norman Hillmer found that a survey of Canadian historians ranked Bowell #19 out of the 20 Prime Ministers up until then.

Until 2017, Bowell remained the only Canadian prime minister without a full-length biography of his life and career. This shortfall was solved when the Belleville historian Betsy Dewar Boyce's book The Accidental Prime Minister was published by Bancroft, Ontario publisher Kirby Books. The book was published on the centennial of Bowell's death. Boyce had died in 2007, having unsuccessfully sought a publisher for her work for a decade.

Supreme Court appointments
The following jurist was appointed to the Supreme Court of Canada by the Governor General during Bowell's tenure:
 Désiré Girouard (September 28, 1895 – March 22, 1911)

See also

 List of prime ministers of Canada

Archives 
There is a Sir Mackenzie Bowell fonds at Library and Archives Canada. It includes 6.1 m of textual records.

Further reading
The Accidental Prime Minister, by Betsy Dewar Boyce, 2017, Kirby Publishing, Bancroft, Ontario, .

Notes

External links

 
 
 J. L. Granatstein and Norman Hillmer, Prime Ministers: Ranking Canada's Leaders, Toronto: HarperCollins Publishers Ltd., a Phyllis Bruce Book, 1999. pp. 42–44. .
 
Photograph:Hon. Mackenzie Bowell, 1881 - McCord Museum

1823 births
1917 deaths
Canadian Ministers of Finance
Canadian Ministers of Railways and Canals
19th-century Canadian newspaper publishers (people)
Canadian Presbyterians
Canadian senators from Ontario
Deaths from pneumonia in Ontario
English emigrants to pre-Confederation Ontario
Conservative Party of Canada (1867–1942) senators
Canadian Knights Commander of the Order of St Michael and St George
Leaders of the Conservative Party of Canada (1867–1942)
Members of the King's Privy Council for Canada
People from Mid Suffolk District
Politicians from Belleville, Ontario
Prime Ministers of Canada
Persons of National Historic Significance (Canada)
Immigrants to Upper Canada
Canadian Freemasons
Argyll Light Infantry
Canadian Militia officers
Canadian Army officers
Hastings and Prince Edward Regiment